Hopea treubii is a tree in the family Dipterocarpaceae, native to Borneo. It is named for the Dutch botanist Melchior Treub.

Description
It has buttresses and flying (detached) buttresses. The bark is fissured.

Distribution and habitat
Hopea treubii is endemic to Borneo.

Conservation
Hopea treubii has been assessed as near threatened on the IUCN Red List. It is threatened by conversion of land for plantations, agriculture and logging roads. The species is also threatened by logging for its timber. The species is found in some protected areas.

References

treubii
Endemic flora of Borneo
Plants described in 1891